Midilambia is a genus of moths of the family Crambidae. It contains only one species, Midilambia colombiana, which is found in Colombia.

References

Natural History Museum Lepidoptera genus database

Musotiminae
Crambidae genera
Taxa named by Eugene G. Munroe